Nemeris percne is a species of geometrid moth in the family Geometridae. It is found in North America.

The MONA or Hodges number for Nemeris percne is 6876.1.

References

Further reading

 

Ourapterygini
Articles created by Qbugbot
Moths described in 1981